Below is a list of presidents of the Swiss Confederation (1848–present). It presents the presiding member of the Swiss Federal Council, the country's seven-member executive.

Elected by the Federal Assembly for one year, the President of the Confederation chairs the meetings of the Federal Council and undertakes special representational duties. Primus inter pares, the officeholder has no powers above the other Federal Councillors and continues to head his or her department. Traditionally, the duty rotates among the members in order of seniority and the previous year's vice president becomes president.

1848–1899

1900–1999

2000–present 
Political parties

See also 
 Presidents of the Swiss Diet (before 1848)
 Chancellor of Switzerland

President of the Confederation

Federal Council (Switzerland)